Cálico Electrónico: La Serie Flash was a Spanish Flash animated web series created by Nikodemo Animation in 2004.

Set in 'Electronic City', its protagonist is a superhero far from the 'classic' hero profile: a short, chubby and not-powered Spanish man ('aspañol' as is called in the series). He risks his life time and again to save the city, using gadgets picked up at the Electronicaweb store.

A chapter usually develops this way: a monster or a criminal attacks the city, Cálico tries to stop it (always unsuccessfully), goes to Electronicaweb, gets a new gadget and saves the day. Some "bloopers" are displayed during the credits, at the end of the episode.

Although the series displays many humorous events, the episodes include much Spanish foul language, so viewer discretion is advised.

Even though Cálico is the main character, many side series have run with it, featuring many characters from the original series.

On June 4, 2009 Nikodemo Animation was shut down completely by its owners due to bankruptcy, which meant the cancellation of all in-progress Cálico Electrónico series' related content, including, but not limited to Rumbarola and animation series.

Characters

Main
 Cálico Electrónico: Superhero, his name is Cálico Jack
 Muzamán: Salesman of Electronicaweb & friend of Cálico Eléctrónico.
 Ardorín: Nephew of Cálico Jack, in the future is Cálico Lúbrico.

Secondary
 Perchita: Character inspired in Nobita, he is a drug addict.
 Donramon: Character inspired in Doraemon, he is a dealer.
 Alarico: Brother of Witerico and Chindasvinta.
 Witerico: Brother of Alarico  and Chindasvinta.
 Chindasvinta: Sister of Witerico and Alarico.
 Sombra Oscura: Character that is hidden from the enemies with his outfit.
 Lobohombre: Character that transforms Aznar when in contact with full moon
 Chacho Migué: The gypsy salesman of Electroni Migué and Electronicaweb's direct competition.

Chapters 
Calico's series was 3 seasons long, every one with 6 episodes, from 2004 to 2008.

Season 1 
 1) El enemigo digital
 2) Los Ri-txars invasores
 3) El Lobombre
 4) Los niños mutantes de Sanildefonso
 5) Historia de amor
 6) Corretón

Season 2 
 1) El fin de Cálico
 2) El fin de Cálico (Part II)
 3) El día que conocí a un super-héroe
 4) Cómo ser Cálico Electrónico
 5) Porque yo lo valgo...
 6) Cálico

Season 3 
 1) Se ha escrito una escabechina
 2) Se ha escrito una escabechina (Part II)
 3) Los pelusos carambanales y otras boludeses
 4) Mira quién lucha
 5) El Ventri Loco
 6) La generación de la bola

Others 
 Noche de paz 2005
 Microsoft Developer Days
 Capítulo especial de Navidad 2007
 Cálico contra Xona-tan y los Ri-txars

Cápsulas/Capsules 
From June 2008 until its end Nikodemos produced a weekly "capsule", or shorter than usual episodes. At the end of every capsule some character from the Cálico universe answered the questions sent by the series' fans by SMS.

Spin-offs 
 Huérfanos Electrónicos
 Los Niños Mutantes De Sanildefonso
 Los Castings de Lobombre y Zombón

References

External links
 
 Electronica Web website

Flash animated web series
Spanish animated television series